Hermann Wagner (23 June 1840 – 18 June 1929) was a German geographer and cartographer and admin PLTM2 who was a native of Erlangen. He was the son of anatomist Rudolf Wagner (1805–1864) and brother to economist Adolph Wagner (1835–1917).

Wagner received his education at the Universities of Göttingen and Erlangen, and from 1864 to 1876, taught classes in mathematics and natural history at the Ernestine Gymnasium, Gotha. When the Freies Deutsches Hochstift (Free German Foundation was founded in 1859, Wagner was one of its 56 founding members.

In 1868, Wagner began work for the publishing firm Justus Perthes as an editor in the statistical section of the Gothaer Almanack. Beginning in 1872, with Ernst Behm, he was editor of the geographical/statistical review Die Bevolkerung der Erde.

In 1876 he was appointed to the chair of geography at the University of Königsberg, and in 1880 was named as successor to Johann Eduard Wappäus as professor of geography at the University of Göttingen. From 1879 to 1920, he was editor of the Geographisches Jahrbuch.

In 1883–84 he published a new edition of Hermann Guthe's Lehrbuch der Geographie. He is also associated with the Sydow-Wagner Methodischer Schulatlas, a school atlas that is named in conjunction with cartographer Emil von Sydow.

References

German geographers
German cartographers
Academic staff of the University of Göttingen
Academic staff of the University of Königsberg
University of Erlangen-Nuremberg alumni
People from Erlangen
1840 births
1929 deaths
Recipients of the Cullum Geographical Medal
Founding members of the Freies Deutsches Hochstift